Jaziri is an Arabic surname. Notable people with the surname include:

Fadhel Jaziri (born 1948), Tunisian actor and film director
Lassaâd Jaziri (born 1990), Tunisian footballer
Malaye Jaziri (1570-1640), one of the most famous Kurdish writer, poet and mystic
Malek Jaziri (born 1984), Tunisian tennis player
Seifeddine Jaziri (born 1993), Tunisian footballer
Ziad Jaziri (born 1978), former Tunisian footballer

See also
Dar Al Jaziri, palace in the medina of Tunis

Arabic-language surnames